ŠK LR Crystal Lednické Rovne is a Slovak association football club located in Lednické Rovne. It currently plays in 3. Liga.

Colors and badge 
Its colors are dark blue.

References

External links
Lednické Rovne on Sme.sk 

Football clubs in Slovakia